The Goddard School is an early childhood education provider with more than 500 franchised Schools in 37 states and hundreds of markets, including the Atlanta, Boston, Chicago, Houston, New York City, Philadelphia, Portland, and St. Louis markets. Goddard Systems, Inc. (GSI) franchises The Goddard School from its headquarters in King of Prussia, Pennsylvania.

History 

The Goddard School was founded in 1983 with an opening date of September 1984 by Lois Goddard Haines in an effort to better the lives of children and their families who required childcare. The logo used by later owners features the original carousel horse which Ms. Haines had installed in the entrance hall of the original school. The school was located at 250 Paoli Pike, Malvern, Pennsylvania.

The Goddard School was the first childcare center to obtain licenses from The Pennsylvania Department of Education and The Department of Public Welfare to serve as a model to elevate the standard of care and early childhood education.

The original school incorporated a variety of teaching methods and progressive ideologies from all areas of child psychology and neurology to create a warm yet individualized experience to meet each child's needs.

The original Goddard School augmented the daily curriculum with art, theatre, music, garden to table, and made use of traveling programs of The Philadelphia Museum of Art, The Please Touch Museum, and The Franklin Institute.

Influenced by friends Peter Bergson and Susan Shilcock, co founders of Open Connections, Ms. Haines custom designed an interior play environment as well as the outdoor playground equipment for maximum safety and enjoyment .

The school served children from two years and seven months through Kindergarten with a student to teacher ratio of 3:1.

The Goddard School was sold to Joseph Scandone, et al., in 1988.

In 1988, Anthony A. Martino, founder of the AAMCO Transmissions and MAACO Auto Painting and Bodyworks franchises, established Carousel Systems, Inc. to offer Goddard Early Learning Center childcare and preschool franchises. Goddard Early Learning Centers became The Goddard School in 1993. In 1996, Philip Schumacher became president of Carousel Systems. In 1999, the 100th Goddard School opened in Pickerington, Ohio.

Wind River Holdings, LP acquired the franchise assets of Carousel Systems in 2002 and continued franchising Carousel Systems as Goddard Systems, Inc. The first West Coast Goddard School opened the same year in Portland, Oregon. The 200th Goddard School opened in Vancouver, Washington in 2005. In 2007, Joe Schumacher, who represented the company as outside counsel for 20 years, joined GSI as the chief operating officer. The following year, the 300th Goddard School opened in Centennial, Colorado. Joe Schumacher became president and CEO in 2010. In 2013, the 400th Goddard School opened in Highland Heights, Ohio, and The Goddard School celebrated 25 years of learning through play by raising more than $188,000 for Ronald McDonald House Charities in one month. In June 2019, the 500th Goddard School opened in Bala Cynwyd, Pennsylvania. In September of the same year, Dennis R. Maple became president and CEO, and Joe Schumacher became chairman of GSI’s board of directors.

GSI was named the number one childcare franchise in the United States by Entrepreneur magazine for the fifteenth consecutive year (January 2016) and one of the Top 200 Franchise Systems (in worldwide sales) by Franchise Times for the tenth consecutive year (October 2016).

Curriculum 

The Goddard School offers preschool programs for children from six weeks to six years old. The Goddard School’s proprietary F.L.EX.® Learning Program focuses on building children’s emotional, academic, social, creative and physical skills through play-based learning. The FLEX Learning program is structured around developmental guidelines, child-focused lesson plans, a creative and fun learning environment, and child-centered teachable moments. The program is based on research that shows that children experience the most genuine learning when they are having fun. Each School also provides additional learning programs, such as baby sign language, yoga, music, Spanish and Mandarin. Additionally, Goddard School teachers provide parents with daily activity reports and schedule regular conferences throughout the year to discuss children’s progress and behaviors with parents. Some centers send daily photos to parents as well.

Accreditation 

GSI received AdvancED Corporation Accreditation in January 2009 and Middle States Corporate Accreditation in 2012. Many Schools have achieved or are pursuing individual School accreditation with AdvancED, the Middle States Association, the National Association for the Education of Young Children and/or individual state accreditation programs.

Quality assurance 

The Goddard School Quality Assurance (QA) program measures each Goddard School against internal standards, which are often stricter than state requirements. The Goddard QA team makes unannounced visits and provides helpful guidance on how to continuously improve for the benefit of the children and their families.
 
Goddard Quality Assurance ensures: respect for the individual needs of every child, a warm and nurturing atmosphere in a safe setting, open and daily communication with families, a professional faculty committed to early childhood development, and a learning environment with opportunities for creativity and exploration.

Affiliations 

In 2011, the Partnership for 21st Century Skills, a national organization that advocates for 21st century readiness for students, named GSI a Strategic Council Member.

The International Association for Continuing Education and Training (IACET) approved Goddard Systems University (GSU), which provides ongoing training for Goddard School teachers, as an Authorized Provider.

Organization

Franchising 

Each Goddard School is independently owned and operated by franchisees. These franchisees receive training at GSI’s corporate office in King of Prussia, Pennsylvania before opening their Schools. GSI provides franchisees with ongoing support in real estate, site development, operations, IT, marketing, advertising, quality assurance and training.

The Goddard School has opened metro or downtown locations in several cities, including Chicago, Illinois; Cincinnati, Ohio; Atlanta, Georgia; Wilmington, Delaware; Pittsburgh, Pennsylvania; and New York, New York.

Leadership

Leadership Team 

 Dennis R. Maple, Chairman & Chief Executive Officer
 Jacqueline Burls, SVP, Chief School Support Services Officer
 Tim Dwyer, Chief Financial Officer, Treasurer & Secretary
 Christina Estrada, SVP, Chief Human Resources & Learning Officer
 Marcel Nahm, SVP, Chief Marketing Officer
 Cynthia Turner, SVP, Chief Legal Officer
 Dr. Lauren Starnes, SVP, Chief Academic Officer

Educational Advisory Board 
 Dr. Craig Bach, Ph.D., Learning Assessment, Learning Analytics
 Helen Hadani, Ph.D., Creative Thinking, Child Development
 Jennifer Jipson, Ph.D., STEAM in Early Learning, Learning Outside the Classroom
 Dr. Jack Maypole, M.D., Pediatric Health and Well-Being, Public Health and Policy
 Dr. Kyle Pruett, M.D., Family Engagement and Parenting, Social-Emotional Development
 Lee Scott, Curriculum and Enrichment Programs, Professional Development

See also

References 

1988 establishments in Pennsylvania
Preschools in the United States
Early childhood education